Hypotia aglossalis is a species of snout moth in the genus Hypotia. It has a wingspan of 20mm.

I it is known from Mozambique, South Africa, Zimbabwe but records also include the Western Sahara.

References

Moths described in 1906
Hypotiini